Pompeo Marchesi (7 August 1783, in Saltrio, near Milan – 6 February 1858, in Milan) was a Lombard sculptor of the neoclassical school.

Biography 
He first studied at the Brera Academy of Fine Arts in Milan. In 1804 he won a scholarship to study in Rome under Canova, from whom he received much encouragement. The greater part of his life was spent in Milan, where for many years he was professor of sculpture at the Academy. He executed a large number of groups in marble and portrait busts. One of his earliest works was a larger than life statue of St. Ambrose, patron of the city, for the Duomo of Milan. For the Arco della Pace (commemorative arch now in the Parco Sempione), completed in 1838, he made various reliefs including of Terpsichore and Venus Urania, and of the rivers Adige and Tagliamento. He decorated the façade of the Castello with twelve figures of great Italian captains, and that of the Palazzo Saporiti with reliefs in modern classic style. One of his best-known compositions is the group of the "Mater Dolorosa", in the church of San Carlo, at which he worked for many years.

Works outside of Milan include the larger than life statue of Charles Emmanuel III in Novara; that of Philibert Emanuel of Savoy in Turin; the sitting figure of Goethe for the library in Frankfurt; two statues of the Emperor Francis I of Austria, one made with the assistance of Manfredoni, for Goritz, and another, unassisted, for the Hofburg in Vienna. He also executed the monument to Volta in Como; the monument of the singer Maria Malibran; others to Cesare Beccaria and Bellini and a bust of Professor Zuccala for the Atheneum of Bergamo. There is a portrait of him by Francesco Hayez in the Galleria d'Arte Moderna, Milan.

Sources 
 The entry cites:
Boccardo, Nuova Enciclopedia Italiana, XIII (Turin, 1882);
Baedeker, Guide Book for Italy (New York, 1904).

19th-century Italian sculptors
Italian male sculptors
1790 births
1858 deaths
Brera Academy alumni
Academic staff of Brera Academy
19th-century Italian male artists